State Road 356 in the U.S. state of Indiana consists of two segments, both in the southern portion of the state.  The western segment is about 10 miles long, and the eastern segment is about 15 miles long.

Route description

Western section
The western segment SR 356 starts at an intersection with SR 57 in downtown Petersburg and travels eastward. The road travels through the east side of Petersburg before entering rural Pike County, traveling through farmland. SR 356 passes through Alford before crossing over Interstate 69 (I-69). After crossing I-69, SR 356 passes through Algiers before ending at a three-way junction with SR 257, northwest of Otwell.

Eastern section
The eastern section of SR 356 starts at a junction with US 31 west of Vienna and travels eastward. The road crosses the Louisville and Indiana Railroad before passing through Vienna. After Vienna SR 356 travels across farmland in Scott County before having a four-way intersection with SR 3. The highway continues east entering the town of Lexington. In downtown Lexington SR 356 has a short concurrency with SR 203 before leaving Lexington. East of Lexington SR 356 curves towards the northeast and enters Jefferson County. SR 356 ends at a three-way junction with SR 62, just south of the intersection between SR 56 and SR 62, a few miles west of Hanover, in rural Jefferson County.

History
SR 356 was commissioned in 1932 routed between Lexington and SR 62. Between 1939 and 1941 the route was extended west to US 31, in Vienna. The western segment of SR 356, between SR 57 and SR 257 was also added to the state road system at this time. Both segment of SR 356 were paved around 1966.

Major intersections

References

External links

 Indiana Highway Ends - SR 356

356
Transportation in Pike County, Indiana
Transportation in Scott County, Indiana
Transportation in Jefferson County, Indiana